Lee Hsin Chiao (李信樵), known professionally by his stage name King Kong Lee (born 19 January 1981), is a Taiwanese actor and comedian. He hosted the popular Super Trio series  and has played some notable roles in some dramas such as No Regrets as a Japanese general. In 2021, he and his girlfriend Kelly Huang launched an online business selling Hong Kong-style chicken wings.

Filmography

 The Sexy Guys (2019)
 The Incredible Monk 3 (2019)
 I Love You, You're Perfect, Now Change! (2019)
 She's a Man. He's a Woman (2019)
 Fake Partner (2018)
 Spicy Teacher (2018)
 The Incredible Monk - Dragon Return (2018)
 The Incredible Monk (2018)
 Never Too Late (2017)
 Yellow War (2017)
 Good Take! (2016)
 Buddy Cops (2016)
 From Vegas to Macau III (2016)
 Together (2013)
 Lan Kwai Fong 2 (2012)
 Mr. and Mrs. Gambler (2012)
 I Love Hong Kong 2012 (2012)
 Turning Point 2 (2011)
 Summer Love (2011)
 The Fortune Buddies (2011)
 Love is the Only Answer (2011)
 Marriage with a Liar (2010)
 The Stool Pigeon (2010)
 Break Up Club (2010)
 Ip Man (2008)
 Open to Midnight (2007)
 My Sassy Teacher (2006)
 Better than Sex (2002)

TVB dramas
狀王之王 (TBA)
Destination Nowhere (2017)No Reserve (2017)The Exorcist's Meter (2017)Love as a Predatory Affair (2016)Captain of Destiny (2015)Eye in the Sky (2015)Never Dance Alone (2014) Gilded Chopsticks (2014) Triumph in the Skies II (2013) King Maker (2012)Ghetto Justice II (2012)Let It Be Love (2012)Super Snoops (2011)No Regrets (2010)OL Supreme (2010)E.U. (2009)Express Boy (2005)Love Contract (2004)Lover of Herb (2004)Seventh Grade (2003)

Other TV SeriesGuardian Angel 2018 Web Drama (2018 Shaw Brothers drama)Marry Me! (CTS, 2006)Ba Xing Bao Xi (八星報喜) (2005)Evil Spirit 05 (GTV, 2005)Beauty Lady (CTS, 2004)Dance of the Heart (2004)Tian Xia Wu Shuang (CTV, 2002)Spicy Teacher'' (CTS, 2002)

References

External links

TVB actors
1981 births
Living people
Taiwanese-born Hong Kong artists